Restoration is the tenth studio album by American Christian hip hop artist Lecrae, released on August 21, 2020, through Reach Records. The album features appearances from YK Osiris, Marc E. Bassy, John Legend, Jozzy, Kirk Franklin, DaniLeigh, BJ the Chicago Kid and Gwen Bunn. A deluxe edition of the album, with six additional tracks, was released on November 13, 2020, which included additional guest appearances from Rapsody, Ty Brasel, as well as labelmates Andy Mineo, Hulvey, WHATUPRG, Wande and 1K Phew. The album peaked at No. 1 on the US Christian Albums chart and No. 5 on the UK Christian & Gospel Albums chart. It received universal critical acclaim. It also received a Best Contemporary Christian Music Performance/Song nomination at the 63rd Annual Grammy Awards for the song "Sunday Morning".

Background
Lecrae announced the album along with a new upcoming book, I Am Restored: How I Lost My Religion but Found My Faith, in February 2020. Lecrae subsequently left Columbia Records and returned to being a fully independent artist.

During the several years prior to the album's release, Lecrae had struggled with clinical depression, anxiety, suicidal thoughts, and marital problems, and considered abandoning Christianity. He attributes much of this to trauma he encountered in his childhood, trauma which resurfaced when he started facing relentless criticism from many Christians. After a trip to Israel with a group of Christian hip hop artists, including labelmate Andy Mineo as well as FLAME, Derek Minor, Canon, and Spechouse, which included the group being baptized in the Jordan River, Lecrae was restored in his faith. He also went to therapy and repaired his relationship with his wife.

Promotion
On March 20, 2020, Lecrae released the album's lead single "Set Me Free" featuring YK Osiris. On June 24, 2020, the second single "Deep End" was released. On July 17, 2020, the third single "Drown" featuring John Legend was released.

Conceptual theme 
Lecrae has stated that the theme of the album is about mending what is broken, both as an individual and in society, and finding holistic restoration and healing, particularly from God. He told Forbes that "I think a lot of times we're looking for where that restoration can come from and we're missing the reality that we have the God-given ingenuity and the light in us to do the work that we want to see done in society and in the world. I believe that's possible. I've sat in therapist chairs. I've done meditation. I believe holistically we can be restored, regardless of our circumstances. That's the heartbeat of the album." In an interview with The Christian Post, he said that "God is more perfect than I am and there's nothing we can do to make Him love us more or less. There's no situation that we're in that He's not wanting to help us through."

Critical reception

Neil Z. Yeung from AllMusic rated the album four-and-a-half stars out of five and considered it the best album of Lecrae's career. Scott Fryberger of Jesus Freak Hideout gave the album 4 stars out of 5, praising the theme, sound and lyrics of the album. He also praised Lecrae for his vulnerability on the album by saying "Lecrae's journey through hell and back is inspirational and relatable, and the music it's paired with is some of his best work in years". Tess Schoonhoven of American Songwriter rated the album 4.5 out of 5. They were of the opinion that the feature credits on Restoration rendered it more multi-dimensional than 2018's Let the Trap Say Amen, and remarked that it "sheds a surprising and approachable light into the niche genre [of Christian hip hop]".

Track listing

Sample credits
 "Set Me Free" contains a sample from "Shackles (Praise You)" performed by Mary Mary and interpolations from "Same Old Story" written and performed by TQ Dat Mayne featuring B.B. King
 "Deep End" contains a sample from "Deep End" performed by John Summit and interpolations from "Deep End Freestyle" written and performed by Sleepy Hallow and Fousheé
 "Zombie" contains a sample from "We're Blessed" performed by Fred Hammond & Radical for Christ and interpolations from "I'm 'n Luv (wit a Stripper)" written and performed by T-Pain featuring Mike Jones 
 "Keep Going" contains interpolations from "Celebrate More" written and performed by 116, Andy Mineo & Hulvey featuring Lecrae

Charts

References

Lecrae albums
2020 albums
Reach Records albums